Underwater Nightmare is a vinyl 7"/digital EP by gothic country band O'Death.

Track listing

Personnel
Greg Jamie - vocals, guitar
Gabe Darling - backing vocals, ukulele, guitar, banjo
David Rogers-Berry - drums, whoop
Bob Pycior - fiddle, guitar
Jesse Newman - bass
Dan Sager - euphonium

References

2009 albums
O'Death albums